Bryan is a surname found in the English-speaking world.

This surname has several different origins. One origin of the name is from an Anglo-Norman name, de Brionne,  derived from either of two places called Brionne in the north of France—one is Brionne, in Eure; the other is Brionne in Creuse. It may also come from de Brienne from Brienne-le-Château. Another origin of the surname is as a patronymic, being borne by someone who was son of an individual named Bryan.  In addition to being found in Brittany, it was used among the Breton followers of the Normans who appear in England and Ireland. Alternatively, Bryan might be the anglicized form of the Irish surname O'Brien. The Irish spelling of the surname Brien, Brian or the Norman spelling Bryan would then have a much longer origin in Ireland than in Brittany, predating the Normans.

People with this surname

 Albert Vickers Bryan (1899–1984), American judge
 Albert Vickers Bryan Jr. (1926–2019), American judge
 Alfred Bryan, American songwriter
 Arthur Bryan, British business executive
 Arthur Q. Bryan, American comedian
 Ashley Bryan (1923-2022), American author and illustrator
 The Bryan brothers, a tennis doubles team made up of American twin brothers Bob and Mike Bryan (born 1978)
 Brother Bryan, American Presbyterian minister
 Cecil E. Bryan (1878–1951), American architect
 Charles Faulkner Bryan (1911–1955), American composer
 Charles W. Bryan (1867–1945), Governor of Nebraska
 Charlie Bryan (1933–2013), American labor leader
 Daniel Bryan, ring name of American professional wrestler Bryan Danielson (born 1981)
 David Bryan, American musician
 Donald Bryan, American politician
 Dora Bryan, British actress
 Elizabeth Carew née Bryan, mistress of Henry VIII and wife of his close friend, Nicholas Carew
 Elizabeth M. Bryan (1942–2008), British paediatrician
 Ernie Bryan, Welsh footballer
 Sir Francis Bryan, brother of Elizabeth, sixteenth-century politician, known as The Vicar of Hell
 Gary Bryan, American DJ
 Gay Bryan, American long and triple jumper
 George Bryan (1731–1791), colonial Pennsylvania businessman and politician
 George Bryan, Scottish curler, European champion
 George Hartley Bryan (1864–1928), English mathematician and engineer
 Godfrey Bryan (1902–1991), English cricketer
 Goode Bryan American Civil War Confederate general
 Henderson Bryan, Barbadian cricketer
 Henry Francis Bryan, 17th Governor of American Samoa
 Henry Hunter Bryan, American politician
 Jack Bryan, English cricketer
 Jane Bryan, American actress
 Jenny Bryan, Canadian professor and R developer
 Jimmy Bryan, American racing driver
 John Davies Bryan (1857-1888), Welsh retailer 
 John H. Bryan, American CEO
 John Neely Bryan, Founder of the city of Dallas
 Joseph Hunter Bryan, American politician
 Joseph M. Bryan, American businessman and philanthropist
 Karen Bryan, Speech therapist and deputy vice-chancellor of the University of Greenwich
 Kean Bryan, English footballer
 Kirk Bryan (geologist), American geologist
 Kirk Bryan (oceanographer) (born 1929), American oceanographer
 Lettice Bryan (1805–1877), American author
 Luke Bryan, American country music singer-songwriter
 Margaret Bryan, made Baroness Bryan in her own right for running the households of all four of Henry VIII's acknowledged children
 Mark Bryan, Veterinarian
 Marvin Bryan, English footballer
 Michael Bryan (art historian), Art connoisseur and author
 Nathan Bryan, American politician
 Nathan P. Bryan, American politician
 Quisi Bryan (born 1970), American murderer on death row
 Rebecca Bryan, wife of Daniel Boone
 Richard Bryan, American politician
 Ronnie Bryan (1898–1970), English cricketer
 Sabrina Bryan, American actress
 Samuel Bryan, American political writer
 Taven Bryan, American football player
 Thomas Bryan (VC), British soldier
 Thomas Bryan (Chief Justice), English judge who served as Chief Justice of the Court of Common Pleas
 Vincent P. Bryan, Canadian songwriter
 William James Bryan (1876–1908), US Senator from Florida
 William Jennings Bryan (1860–1925), American politician and three-time Presidential candidate
 William Joel Bryan, Texan soldier & landowner
 Zachery Ty Bryan (born 1981), American actor

See also 
 Brian, given name and surname
 Bryan (given name)

References

English-language surnames